Christophe Bertjens (born 5 January 1993) is a professional football midfielder. He currently plays for Saint Gilloise in the Belgian First Division B.

References

Belgian footballers
1993 births
Living people
Sint-Truidense V.V. players
Lommel S.K. players
Belgian Pro League players
Challenger Pro League players
Association football midfielders
People from Tongeren
Footballers from Limburg (Belgium)